In mathematics a Lie coalgebra is the dual structure to a Lie algebra.

In finite dimensions, these are dual objects: the dual vector space to a Lie algebra naturally has the structure of a Lie coalgebra, and conversely.

Definition
Let E be a vector space over a field k equipped with a linear mapping  from E to the exterior product of E with itself.  It is possible to extend d uniquely to a graded derivation (this means that, for any a, b ∈ E which are homogeneous elements) of degree 1 on the exterior algebra of E:

Then the pair (E, d) is said to be a Lie coalgebra if d2 = 0,
i.e., if the graded components of the exterior algebra with derivation 
form a cochain complex:

Relation to de Rham complex
Just as the exterior algebra (and tensor algebra) of vector fields on a manifold form a Lie algebra (over the base field K), the de Rham complex of differential forms on a manifold form a Lie coalgebra (over the base field K). Further, there is a pairing between vector fields and differential forms.

However, the situation is subtler: the Lie bracket is not linear over the algebra of smooth functions  (the error is the Lie derivative), nor is the exterior derivative:  (it is a derivation, not linear over functions): they are not tensors. They are not linear over functions, but they behave in a consistent way, which is not captured simply by the notion of Lie algebra and Lie coalgebra.

The Lie algebra on the dual
A Lie algebra structure on a vector space is a map  which is skew-symmetric, and satisfies the Jacobi identity. Equivalently, a map  that satisfies the Jacobi identity.

Dually, a Lie coalgebra structure on a vector space E is a linear map  which is antisymmetric (this means that it satisfies , where  is the canonical flip ) and satisfies the so-called cocycle condition (also known as the co-Leibniz rule)

.

Due to the antisymmetry condition, the map  can be also written as a map .

The dual of the Lie bracket of a Lie algebra  yields a map (the cocommutator)

where the isomorphism  holds in finite dimension; dually for the dual of Lie comultiplication. In this context, the Jacobi identity corresponds to the cocycle condition.

More explicitly, let E be a Lie coalgebra over a field of characteristic neither 2 nor 3.  The dual space E* carries the structure of a bracket defined by
α([x, y]) = dα(x∧y), for all α ∈ E and x,y ∈ E*.

We show that this endows E* with a Lie bracket.  It suffices to check the Jacobi identity.  For any x, y, z ∈ E* and α ∈ E, 

where the latter step follows from the standard identification of the dual of a wedge product with the wedge product of the duals.  Finally, this gives

Since d2 = 0, it follows that
, for any α, x, y, and z.
Thus, by the double-duality isomorphism (more precisely, by the double-duality monomorphism, since the vector space needs not be finite-dimensional), the Jacobi identity is satisfied.

In particular, note that this proof demonstrates that the cocycle condition d2 = 0 is in a sense dual to the Jacobi identity.

References

Coalgebras
Lie algebras